Fan Tingyu (born 6 August 1996) is a Chinese professional Go player.

He won the 17th Xinren Wang and 18th Xinren Wang.

Fan defeated Park Junghwan (b. 1993) [3-1] in the final of the 7th (2012/13) Ing Cup, and became the youngest Ing Cup title holder in history. Fan is also the second-youngest 9 dan (Lee Changho became 9 dan a bit before Fan) in history.

Promotion record

Career Record
2010: 31 wins, 12 losses
2011: 15 wins, 8 losses

Titles and Runners-up

References

1996 births
Living people
Go players from Shanghai